Hystrix refossa is an extinct species of large porcupine that was widespread in Eurasia during the Pleistocene.

Taxonomy
Hystrix refossa was first described by palaeontologist Paul Gervais in 1852. Over the years, other large species of Hystrix have been described, including H. angressi from Israel and H. gigantea of Java. These forms are now considered synonymous with H. refossa.

Description
Hystrix refossa was larger than living porcupines. It also differs from the Indian porcupine in having a high and narrow occipital region, in the anteriorly convergent arrangement of maxillary cheek-teeth series, and in its mandible and the cheek-teeth pattern.

Paleoecology
The earliest remains of H. refossa are dated to the start of the Villafranchian and were found at the site of Milea, Grevena in northern Greece. It presumably inhabited vegetated river banks within a mosaic of open and forested terrain under warm and humid conditions.

References

Prehistoric rodents
Pleistocene rodents
Pleistocene mammals of Europe
Prehistoric mammals of Europe
Pleistocene mammals of Asia
Prehistoric mammals of Asia
Hystricidae